Șopârlița is a commune in Olt County, Oltenia, Romania. It is composed of a single village, Șopârlița, and was established in 2004, when it was split off from Pârșcoveni Commune.

References

Communes in Olt County
Localities in Oltenia